Ladislav Totkovič (12 March 1962 – 28 January 2016) was a former football player from Slovakia and manager. His former club was also 1. FC Tatran Prešov. In October 2013 he was appointed manager of Malacca United.

References

1962 births
2016 deaths
Slovak footballers
Slovak football managers
Slovak expatriate footballers
FK Inter Bratislava players
1. FC Tatran Prešov managers
FC ViOn Zlaté Moravce managers
Sportspeople from Ružomberok
Association footballers not categorized by position